Gustavo Vilar dos Santos (born 18 April 2000), known as Gustavo Vilar or just Vilar, is a Brazilian footballer who currently plays as a central defender for Londrina.

Club career
Born in Guarujá, São Paulo, Vilar played amateur tournaments in his hometown before joining Santos in September 2019, after a trial period. He signed a three-month contract with the club in December, being initially assigned to the under-20 team.

On 22 March 2020, Vilar left Peixe as his contract expired, and signed for Maringá on 8 September. He helped the club to achieve promotion from the Campeonato Paranaense Série Prata in that year, and became a regular starter afterwards.

On 27 August 2021, Vilar moved on loan to São Bernardo for the Copa Paulista, but did not play. He returned to his parent club on 6 December, and was again a starter as they reached the 2022 Campeonato Paranaense finals.

On 12 April 2022, Vilar was loaned to Série B side Londrina, with a buyout clause. On 2 August, after already establishing himself as a first-choice, he signed a permanent deal until 2025, after the club bought 50% of his economic rights.

Career statistics

Club

Notes

References

2000 births
Living people
People from Guarujá
Footballers from São Paulo (state)
Brazilian footballers
Association football defenders
Campeonato Brasileiro Série B players
Maringá Futebol Clube players
São Bernardo Futebol Clube players
Londrina Esporte Clube players